Soterios Johnson is an American radio journalist and the former local host of National Public Radio's Morning Edition on New York City public-radio station WNYC.

A Highland Park, New Jersey native, Johnson graduated from Highland Park High School, where he participated in the school's radio station. He worked at a small FM station in his hometown while earning his undergraduate degree in American history from Columbia University in New York City, granted in 1990. While there he was active at the institution's radio station WKCR-FM (89.9 FM). Subsequently, he received a master's degree from the Columbia University Graduate School of Journalism. His first name comes from his Greek heritage.

The New York Sun newspaper has claimed: "A steady, soulful tenor of a voice — combined with a first name that is as mellifluous as it is unusual — has won public radio host Soterios Johnson a legion of devoted fans, some of whom have gone so far as to write songs in his honor and name pets after him."

He has reminisced: "As a kid, I always wanted to be in the know... and to spread the word."

In the summer of 2016, Johnson left WNYC to join the University of California, Davis as Director of Humanities, Arts, and Cultural Programs. He moved to join his husband, who had been based in California since December 2014.

Influence on music
His name is the inspiration for the name of New York City three-piece band Satirius Johnson.

Jonathan Coulton, a folk-rock artist also based in New York, wrote a song called "Dance, Soterios Johnson, Dance", which presents a fictionalized secret life of Johnson as a club-goer.

Awards
2006 New York Press Club award

References

External links
 WNYC Biography
Interview with Johnson in Columbia College Today
"Dance, Soterios Johnson, Dance" by Jonathan Coulton
The band Satirius Johnson

American people of Greek Cypriot descent
Columbia College (New York) alumni
Columbia University Graduate School of Journalism alumni
LGBT people from California
LGBT people from New Jersey
LGBT people from New York (state)
Living people
NPR personalities
Highland Park High School (New Jersey) alumni
People from Highland Park, New Jersey
Place of birth missing (living people)
University of California, Davis faculty
Year of birth missing (living people)